The First Battle of Nowa Wies took place on February 21, 1863, near the village of Nowa Wies, Russian-controlled Congress Poland. It was one of many skirmishes of the January Uprising, the anti-Russian rebellion of Poles. A group of some 600 Polish insurgents under Ludwik Mieroslawski clashed with 500 soldiers of the Imperial Russian Army. The battle ended in Russian victory.

After the lost Battle of Krzywosadz (February 19), General Ludwik Mieroslawski retreated to Nowa Wies, where he camped with his soldiers. In the evening of February 21, Polish insurgents were taken by surprise, when Russian forces surrounded them, and attacked.  Mieroslawski's unit was completely destroyed, also due to internal arguments between different factions in Polish camp. Most insurgents retreated towards the nearby Prussian border, and Mieroslawski himself resigned from his post as leader of the uprising.

Sources 
 Stefan Kieniewicz: Powstanie styczniowe. Warszawa: Państwowe Wydawnictwo Naukowe, 1983. .

Conflicts in 1863
1863 in Poland
Nowa Wies
February 1863 events
Warsaw Governorate